Aaron Wilson is an Australian filmmaker, known for the 2013 suspense war drama Canopy and the 2021 period drama Little Tornadoes.

Early life
His grandmother, who moved to Melbourne after her husband died, became a strong influence in Wilson's life.

Career
Wilson has made several short films, which have screened at numerous festivals, with some gaining international sales and garnering awards. These include Ten Feet Tall, Feng (Wind), Leap Year, My Name is Martin, and Ahmad’s Garden, which premiered at the 2008 Melbourne International Film Festival (MIFF). He has also made commercials in Southeast Asia.

Wilson developed the script for his first feature film Canopy, while he was undertaking a filmmaker residency program with Objectifs Centre for Filmmaking and Photography in Singapore. The film dealt with war and its impact on people, and had very little dialogue.

His second feature film is Little Tornadoes, which was co-written by Australian author Christos Tsiolkas, who was brought into the project in 2019 when he felt that the narration needed stronger writing. It was filmed in 2009 on a tiny budget, back to back with Canopy, and Wilson has described it as second film in his PTSD trilogy. The film, set in 1972 rural Australia, deals with the impact of post-traumatic stress disorder on a family. It had its world premiere at MIFF in 2021, and also screened at Brisbane International Film Festival and CinefestOZ. It received an honourable mention as one of ACMI's Best Films of 2021. The film was released in Australian cinemas on 12 May 2022.

Wilson has said that he explores the themes of masculinity and isolation (physical and emotional) in both Canopy and Little Tornadoes.

Wilson's short VR film, Iopu is about a queer Samoan-Australian performer. It also premiered at MIFF in 2021, and Wilson won the 2021 ADG Award for Best Direction in an Interactive or Immersive Title for the film.

 Wilson is again working with Tsiolkas on a film set in rural Australia that is "perhaps a little more fun".

References

External links

 
 (7 May 2022; 14 mins)

Australian film directors